Stefan Rusch (born 31 May 1993) is a Dutch Paralympic athlete who competes in international level events. He is a triple World bronze medalist and a triple European champion in 100 metres, 200 metres and 400 metres. He participated at the 2012 Summer Paralympics where he finished sixth in the final of the men's 100m T34 and 200m T34.

References

1993 births
Living people
Paralympic athletes of the Netherlands
Dutch male wheelchair racers
Athletes (track and field) at the 2012 Summer Paralympics
Medalists at the World Para Athletics Championships
Medalists at the World Para Athletics European Championships